Aprophata semperi is a species of beetle in the family Cerambycidae. It was described by John O. Westwood in 1863. It is known from the Philippines.

References

Pteropliini
Beetles described in 1863